Martin Fröhlke is a former West German slalom canoeist who competed in the 1980s and the 1990s. He won a bronze medal in the C-2 team event at the 1989 ICF Canoe Slalom World Championships in Savage River.

References

External links 
 Martin FRÖHLKE at CanoeSlalom.net

German male canoeists
Living people
Year of birth missing (living people)
Place of birth missing (living people)
Medalists at the ICF Canoe Slalom World Championships